Arthur James Bater (29 December 1889 – 5 April 1969) was an English-Canadian politician and farmer. He was elected to the House of Commons of Canada in the 1949 election and defeated in the 1953 election.

External links

1889 births
1959 deaths
British emigrants to Canada
Canadian people of Cornish descent
Liberal Party of Canada MPs
Members of the House of Commons of Canada from Saskatchewan
Place of death missing
Farmers from Cornwall